The Wedge is a mountain in Alberta, Canada. It is part of the Fisher Range of the Southern Continental Ranges of the Canadian Rockies. It is located east of Highway 40 just southeast from the K-Country golf course, immediately southeast of Wedge Pond in Kananaskis Country.

Scramble
 gain, mostly easy with a moderate section just above the tree line and a short difficult section on the ridge.  The trail starts from the wedge pond parking lot.  Either follow the shore counter clock wise until a trail takes off into the trees or follow the cutline south (right) from the gate to find a trail that soon joins the other and heads up the hill. It's a nice treed walk up  to the tree line.

Once on the rocks the best route up is to keep to the right, beside the cliffs until you can get on top then it's an easy walk up to the false summit. From there a ridge walk leads to the true summit. Then the ridge widens again.

See also
 Mountains of Alberta
 Mountain peaks of Canada

Gallery

References

External links
 Peakware. 
 Scrambling.ca. The Wedge

Two-thousanders of Alberta
Canadian Rockies